The Singleton may refer to:

 A brand of whisky marketed by Diageo
 The Singleton (film), 2015